Forestiera cartaginensis, the Central American olive, is a shrub native to Central America and to Chiapas in southern Mexico.

References

cartaginensis
Flora of Mexico
Plants described in 1897
Flora of Chiapas
Flora of Central America